Hassan Tatanaki is a Libyan-born businessman who invests in building of local Libyan communities civil society programs ranging from organic farming, water resource management, water and waste water treatment, the construction of educational facilities, and improvement of the program at the Tobruk School for the Blind. Most recently, Hassan Tatanaki founded Libya El Hurra Charity (LHC) which aims to provide humanitarian aid and relief to internally displaced, refugees, and vulnerable populations such as women and children in Libya, and refugees situated in Tunisia and Egypt.

Biography
Tatanaki serves as chairman of the oilfield drilling company Challenger Limited. Educated and raised in the United Kingdom, he has directed his private philanthropic efforts toward humanitarian relief for Arab and African states in crisis and to promote moderate interpretations of the Muslim faith. Tatanaki provided the seed funding for Cairo-based Azhari TV, a new satellite television channel launched in August 2009 during the start of Ramadan. The channel aims to discourage extremism and promote the moderate face of Islam. Azhari, which features 24-hour entertainment and education programming, is the brainchild of clerics associated with Al-Azhar University, considered the highest authority of religious teachings in Sunni Islam.

Libya El Hurra Charity (LHC)
Libya El Hurra Charity (LHC) was established within the first week of the Libyan crisis to provide humanitarian aid and relief to internally displaced, refugees, and vulnerable populations such as women and children. LHC is committed to not only providing aid, but also to promoting international awareness of the plight of the Libyan people and displaced persons. LHC is represented by the Libyan people, university professors, students, authors, intellectuals, scientists, and business owners of all ages who have united in support of a common goal: a democratic and prosperous Libya.

Libya El Hurra Charity's mission is to assist the displaced, refugee, and vulnerable populations within Libya and its surrounding countries with humanitarian aid and relief works. Utilizing the unique skill sets of the Libyan people, Libya El Hurra Charity supports the Libyan people as they seek to rebuild their country in all aspects of development. LHC serves as a platform to empower communities, including women and children, providing a forum where all people can openly discuss the future of Libya, while maintaining the highest standards of integrity and accountability.

Libya El Hurra Charity has an extensive global network of volunteers who are determined to help the displaced population of Libya and the prevention of further suffering of vulnerable populations such as women and children. In addition, the dedicated team supports LHC by assisting with humanitarian aid and relief works projects and through raising awareness about the current humanitarian crisis in and around Libya.

Business activities
Challenger Limited, one of the leading drilling, work-over, and oilfield services companies in the region, operates throughout North Africa and the Gulf region. Acquired by Tatanaki in 1991, Challenger currently owns and operates a fleet of 30 rigs and has worked with major energy corporations including Total, Marathon, and Verenex. 

In January 2008, Bronco Drilling acquired a 25% equity interest in Challenger and added several rigs to the overall fleet.

Other activities
Tatanaki is a dedicated philanthropist whose family foundation supports an array of humanitarian, cultural, and educational causes in Africa and the Middle East.  He provided new housing for families in Egypt who were displaced when a section of rock broke off from a large outcrop in the Moqattam district of Cairo in 2008, food and medical supplies to the Southern Sudan during the Second Sudanese Civil War, and development aid for a variety of projects in Libya. Tatanaki and Dr. Khaled Azzam, Chief Executive of The Prince's School of Traditional Arts, signed a Memorandum of Understanding on 30 January 2007, signifying their cooperation to open a school of traditional arts and handicrafts in Tripoli to train Libyan youth in the principles of traditional Islamic art and design. This training is intended to contribute to the ongoing restoration of the urban environment in the old city, or medina, of Tripoli.

References

External links
Tuareg Capital - News: Gulf Financiers in Libya

Living people
Libyan Muslims
Libyan businesspeople
Year of birth missing (living people)